Osbaston is a small village in the English county of Shropshire.

Osbaston lies on the B4396 road some five miles to the south of Oswestry. The population at the 2011 census can be found in Knockin.

External links 

Villages in Shropshire